With You was a 2014 South Korean television program that shows the perspective of couples in late marriages. It aired on JTBC on Tuesdays at 21:30 (KST). Starting from the second season the show changed its name to With You Season 2: The Greatest Love.

Season 1

Couples
 Lee Young-ha & Park Chan-sook (episodes 1–15)
 Ji Sang-ryeol & Park Jun-keum (episodes 16–47)
 Im Hyun-sik & Park Won-sook (episodes 1–24)
 Lee Sang-min & Sayuri Fujita (episodes 27–47)
 Kim Bum-soo & Ahn Moon-sook (episodes 32–47)

Season 2

Couples
 Kim Bum-soo & Ahn Moon-sook (episodes 1–23)
 Jang Seo-hee & Yoon Gun (episodes 1–23)
 Guillaume Patry & Song Min-seo (episodes 24–36)
 Yoon Jung-soo & Kim Sook (episode 24–120)
 Heo Kyung-hwan & Oh Na-mi (episodes 37–77)
 Seo In-young & Crown J (Episode 78–90)
 Yoo Min-sang & Lee Su-ji (Episode 91–103)
 Kim Young-chul & Song Eun-i (episode 102–120)

Guests

Ratings
In the ratings below, the highest rating for the show will be in red, and the lowest rating for the show will be in blue each year.

References

External links
 Season 1 
 Season 2 

2014 South Korean television series debuts
2014 South Korean television series endings
2015 South Korean television series debuts
2017 South Korean television series endings
Korean-language television shows
JTBC original programming
South Korean variety television shows
South Korean dating and relationship reality television series